Friel is a surname, and may refer to

People
 Aisling Friel (born 1980s)
 Anna Friel (born 1976), British actress
 Arthur O. Friel (1887–1959), writer
 Benny Friel (1941–2010), Scottish footballer
 Bill Friel (1876–1959), American baseball player
 Brian Friel (1929–2015), Northern Ireland playwright and director 
 Courtney Friel (born 1980), American television presenter
 Dan Friel (1860–1911), Scottish footballer
 Eddie Friel, musician
 Eileen Friel, American astronomer
 Fran Friel, American author
 George Friel (1910–1975)
 Gerry Friel (1943–2007), basketball coach
 Henry J. Friel (1823–1869), Canadian mayor
 Howard Friel, American scholar and author
 Jack Friel (1898–1995), American college sports coach and executive
 Joe Friel (born 1943), multisport athletics coach
 John Friel (1889–1963), Irish politician and merchant
 Lisa Friel, New York City lawyer and prosecutor
 Mary Therese Friel (born 1960), former Miss USA; now owner-operator of self-named modeling agency
 Pat Friel (1860–1924), American baseball player
 Sheldon Friel (1888–1970), Irish dentist
 Tony Friel (born 1958), British bass guitarist

See also
 O'Friel
 Friels
 Friele (surname)
 Freel

Anglicised Irish-language surnames